Jaime Rosón García (born 13 January 1993 in Madrid) is a Spanish road cyclist, suspended from the sport following an adverse analytical finding in his biological passport. He was named in the startlist for the 2016 Vuelta a España.

Career achievements

Major results

2015
 1st  Road race, National Under-23 Road Championships
2016
 5th Overall Vuelta a Castilla y León
 9th Overall Tour of Turkey
1st Stage 6
  Combativity award Stage 17 Vuelta a España
2017
 2nd Overall Tour of Croatia
1st  Mountains classification
1st Stage 5
 2nd Overall Vuelta a Castilla y León
 3rd Overall Settimana Internazionale Coppi e Bartali
 5th Overall Vuelta a Burgos
2018
 1st  Overall Vuelta a Aragón
 4th Overall Vuelta Ciclista Comunidad de Madrid
1st  Mountains classification
 6th Overall Volta ao Algarve
 8th Overall Tirreno–Adriatico

Grand Tour general classification results timeline

References

External links

1993 births
Living people
Spanish male cyclists
Cyclists from Castile and León
People from Zamora, Spain
Sportspeople from the Province of Zamora